The Battle of Lahasusu was a riverine clash fought during the Sino-Soviet conflict of 1929 around the mouth of the Sungari River.

Battle 
The battle begun when the Soviet Amur Flotilla attacked the garrisoned city of Lahasusu from the river. 
Soviet monitors Lenin, Sverdlov, Sun Yat-sen and Krasnyi Vostok and other minor units faced a Chinese flotilla of 11 units. Chinese steamer Kiang Tai suffered a direct hit, while monitor Lenin set aflame the gunboat Kiang Ping.
The gunboat Lee Ju managed to score hit on the Soviet gunboat Proletarii and the monitor Sun Yat-sen but was eventually hit by Krasnyi Vostok and grounded by its crew. 

Older sources report different transliteration of the Chinese ships, stating gunboats Chantai and Chanan sunk, followed by Chianping, while the ex-German gunboat Lichi was abandoned and taken in tow by Soviets. The army transport steamer n°18 and seven barges were also seized. While the Soviet side suffered human casualties (17 men), they lost no ship.

Aftermath 
With the river battle still ongoing, other Soviet ships successfully landed troops close to Lahasusu and defeated the local garrison. As was common practice for the Soviets during this conflict, Soviet troops opened the grain stores of the city to distribute grain to the population to win their support.
It was a heavy defeat for the Chinese, that were forced to gather their defense at Fushin: there the rest of the Chinese fleet was destroyed.

References

 
 
Lahasusu
Lahasusu
1929 in military history
Lahasusu